Carlos Sánchez Pérez (31 May 1958 – 7 September 2018), known professionally as Ceesepe, was a Spanish painter and illustrator. He was especially prolific in drawings and collages, with his style is often classified as pop art. He is considered a major figure in La Movida Madrileña. His pseudonym is based on the Spanish pronunciation of his initials: C: ce, S: ese, P: pe = "Ceesepe".

In 2011, he received Spain's Gold Medal of Merit in the Fine Arts.

Biography 

At sixteen years old, halfway through the 1970's, Ceesepe was introduced to the world of underground comix, coming into contact with Barcelonian artists and illustrators such as Max, and Javier Mariscal. He worked with them in Barcelona up until 1979. He was one of the most popular painters in the artistic boom of La Movida Madrileña. His work at that stage consisted of screen prints, film posters, album covers, and illustrations.

He created the poster for Pedro Almodóvar's first feature-length film, Pepi, Luci, Bom (1980), and would go on to create eight films himself.

Ceesepe formed a distinctive style from the sum of multiple influences, principally British pop art such as Peter Blake and Peter Phillips, as well as previous artists such as Henri de Toulouse-Lautrec, Amedeo Modigliani, and Marc Chagall. His first individual exhibition took place in 1979, in the gallery Buades de Madrid. In 1982, Menéndez Pelayo International University exhibited a sample of his work. Two years later, he became one of the best-selling artists of  '84. However, one of his cartoon strips, loaded with political allusions to Blas Piñar, Franco, Marx, and Mao, was the basis of an attack by People's Alliance on the magazine where it had been published, Madriz, as well as on the City Council of Madrid, which had subsidized it.

After abandoning comics halfway through the 1980's, he devoted himself mostly to painting, holding exhibitions in places such as Amsterdam, Paris, Angoulême, Geneva, Bali, New York City, and Madrid (Centro Cultural de la Villa, 1985; Real Academia de Bellas Artes de San Fernando, 1991). In 1984, he participated in a collective exhibition in Barcelona's Fundació Joan Miró.

He also created more film posters, such as the one for Almódovar's Law of Desire (1987), and in his final period designed title pages for the Spanish edition of Rolling Stone. The New Yorker hired him on November 22, 1993 for one of their covers.

His work has been collected in books such as Dibujos (1982), Barcelona By Night (1982), París-Madrid (1985), El difícil arte de mentir (1986), Libro blanco (1990), and Ars morundi'' (1990).

He died in Madrid on 7 September 2018 at the age of sixty.

References

External links 
Gallery

1958 births
2018 deaths
Deaths from cancer in Spain
Deaths from leukemia
Spanish poster artists
21st-century Spanish painters
20th-century Spanish painters
Spanish cartoonists
Artists from Madrid